The Franklin Hotel is a historic building located in Strawberry Point, Iowa, United States.  The Franklin Hotel and Land Company was established in 1902 for the purpose of building a modern hotel to serve the community.  They hired the Independence, Iowa architectural firm of Netcott and Donnan to design the building, which was constructed by E.M. Loop of Hopkinton, Iowa.  The hotel opened on February 12, 1903, and the building has served that purpose ever since.  The two-story brick building combines the Neoclassical and Romanesque Revival styles. It sits on the northeast corner of an intersection and its rounded corner follows the curve of the intersection.  The commercial space adjacent to the north is also a part of this building with hotel rooms on the second floor.  Railroad tracks at one time were located just north of the hotel, which served the passengers from the railroad and later travelers from the highways that run past the hotel.  The building was listed on the National Register of Historic Places in 1999.

References

Hotel buildings completed in 1903
Hotels in Iowa
Neoclassical architecture in Iowa
Romanesque Revival architecture in Iowa
Buildings and structures in Clayton County, Iowa
National Register of Historic Places in Clayton County, Iowa
Hotel buildings on the National Register of Historic Places in Iowa